The BMW 018 (RLM designation 109-018) was an early axial-flow turbojet engine project by BMW AG in Germany.

Design 
The 018 design was begun in 1940.

Three engines were at various stages of completion at Staßfurt, but due to continuing efforts toward protracted development of the 003 along with Allied bombing and the liberation of France, official 018 development was stopped in late 1944. On BMW's own initiative, it was decided that the existing 018 development examples would be moved to a pair of successive locations in Bavaria; to Kolbermoor to finish construction, and then move them to Oberwiesenfeld for testing. Despite this planning, the rapidly deteriorating war situation of March 1945 prompted BMW personnel to destroy the engines and their components in order to prevent them from falling into Allied hands.

Specifications

See also

Notes

Bibliography

 

BMW aircraft engines
1940s turbojet engines